Grundgraben may refer to:

Grundgraben (Lohmgraben), a river in Bavaria, Germany, headstream of the Lohmgraben
see Upper Harz Ditches: German for bottom ditch, used in the river names Zankwieser Grundgraben and Stadtweger Grundgraben